South Korean boy band The Boss has been in the music business ever since debuting in March 2010. To date, the band has released one studio album, two extended plays, and fourteen singles. The band has also participated in singing OSTs of Japanese show and Japanese movie.

Studio albums

Extended plays

Singles

Soundtracks

Videography

Live albums

Video albums

Music videos

References

Discographies of South Korean artists
K-pop music group discographies